Emo pop is a fusion genre of emo with pop punk, pop music, or both. The genre developed during the 1990s with it gaining substantial commercial success in the 2000s. The following is a list of artists who play that style in alphabetical order.

List of bands

A
 The Academy Is...
 Afterhour
 Alkaline Trio
 The All-American Rejects
 All Time Low
 Amber Pacific
 The Anniversary
 Attack! Attack!
 The Ataris
 Armor for Sleep
 The Audition

B
 Bayside
 Boston Manor
 Boys Like Girls
 Brandtson
 Brand New

C
 The Cab
 Can't Swim
 Cartel
 Cinematic Sunrise
 Cute Is What We Aim For

D
 Dashboard Confessional
 Destroy Rebuild Until God Shows

E
 The Early November

F
 Fall Out Boy
 Fireworks
 Forever the Sickest Kids
 Further Seems Forever
 FVK

G
 Get Scared
 The Get Up Kids
 Good Charlotte

H
 Halifax
 Hawthorne Heights
 Hellogoodbye
 Hey Mercedes
 Hey Monday
 Hidden in Plain View
 The Higher
 Hot Rod Circuit

J
 Jack's Mannequin
 The Jealous Sound
 Jimmy Eat World
 Joyce Manor
 The Juliana Theory

K
 Knapsack

L
Avril Lavigne
 Lostprophets

M
 Mae
 The Maine
 Matchbook Romance
 Mayday Parade
 Meg & Dia
 Metro Station
 Midtown
 Motion City Soundtrack
 Moose Blood
 My Chemical Romance

N
 Never Shout Never
 New Found Glory
 Northstar

P
 Panic! at the Disco
 Paramore
 Piebald
 Plain White T's
 The Promise Ring

R
 The Ready Set
 Real Friends
 The Red Jumpsuit Apparatus
 The Rocket Summer

S
 Saves the Day
 Say Anything
 Sleeping with Sirens
 Something Corporate
 Sorority Noise
 The Spill Canvas
 Spitalfield
 Stereo Skyline
 Straylight Run
 The Summer Set

T
 Taking Back Sunday
 Thursday
 Tokio Hotel

U
 The Used

W
 We the Kings
 Weezer
 The Wonder Years

Y
 Yellowcard
 You Me at Six

References

Lists of punk bands
Pop musicians by genre
Emo musical groups